William Claude Coyle   (1871–1941) was a pitcher in Major League Baseball for the 1893 Boston Beaneaters. He then played in the minors through 1897. After his playing career ended, he was briefly a manager in 1897 in the Interstate League.

External links

Major League Baseball pitchers
Boston Beaneaters players
Baseball players from Kentucky
1871 births
1941 deaths
19th-century baseball players
Johnstown Terrors players
Reading Actives players
Augusta Kennebecs players
Toledo Mud Hens players
Wheeling Nailers players
Minor league baseball managers